is a Japanese female singer and occasional voice actress. Her body of work is entirely related to the Fushigi Yūgi series. She also had a small voice role (as Kaen) in the series.

Discography
 ranked 38th at Oricon singles charts. – Opening theme for the anime series, Fushigi Yūgi.

 – Opening theme for Fushigi Yūgi's first OVA series.

Star – Opening theme for Fushigi Yūgi's second OVA series.

All of the above songs have also appeared on various Fushigi Yūgi soundtracks.

References

1972 births
Living people
Japanese voice actresses
Japanese-language singers
Voice actresses from Miyagi Prefecture
Musicians from Miyagi Prefecture
21st-century Japanese singers
21st-century Japanese women singers